State Road 650 (SR 650) is a State Road in the southern section of the state of Indiana. The highway is entirely within Martin County and its eastern end is located at the plant's entrance. SR 650 was originally introduced in the mid-1950s.

Route description
SR 650 begins at a four-way intersection with US 50. North of the intersection, the road becomes the main entrance to Martin State Forest. SR 650 heads south from the intersection but curves shortly afterward to head east-southeast. The road passes through wooded areas and over a CSX railroad track. After crossing a tributary of the White River, the road ends at the entrance to the USG plant. SR 650 is an undivided two-lane road for its entire length. In 2014 the only location for a traffic count along SR 650 shows that 838 vehicles travel the highway on average each day.

History 
SR 650 was added to the state road system between 1953 and 1956, as a paved highway. No major changes have occurred to SR 650 since it was added to the state road system.

Major junctions

References

External links

650
Transportation in Martin County, Indiana
State highways in the United States shorter than one mile